Pierre Martin Ngô Đình Thục (6 October 1897 – 13 December 1984) was the Roman Catholic Archbishop of Huế, Vietnam, and later a sedevacantist bishop who was excommunicated by the Vatican and allegedly reconciled with the Vatican before his death in 1984. He was a member of the Ngô family who ruled South Vietnam in the years leading up to the Vietnam War. He was the founder of the Dalat University. Today, various Independent Catholic and sedevacantist groups claim to have derived their apostolic succession from Thục.

While Thục was in Rome attending the second session of the Second Vatican Council, the 1963 South Vietnamese coup overthrew and assassinated his younger brother, Ngô Đình Diệm, who was president of South Vietnam. Thục was unable to return to Vietnam and lived the rest of his life exiled in Italy, France, and the United States. During his exile, he was involved with Traditionalist Catholic movements and consecrated a number of bishops without the Vatican's approval for the Palmarian and Sedevacantist movements. As a result, he was excommunicated by the Holy See, but allegedly reconciled with the Vatican.

Biography

Early life and family

Ngô Đình Thục was born on 6 October 1897, in Huế, French Indochina, to an affluent Roman Catholic family as the second of the six surviving sons born to Ngô Đình Khả, a mandarin of the Nguyễn dynasty who served Emperor Thành Thái during the French occupation of Vietnam.

Thục's elder brother, Khôi, served as a governor and mandarin of the French-controlled Emperor Bảo Đại's administration. At the end of World War Two, both Khôi and Thục's younger brother Diệm were arrested for having collaborated with the Japanese. Diệm was released, but Khôi was subsequently shot by the Việt Minh as part of the August Revolution of 1945 (and not buried alive as is sometimes stated). Thục's brothers Diệm, Nhu and Cẩn, were politically active. Cardinal François Xavier Nguyễn Văn Thuận (1928–2002) was Thục's nephew.

Priesthood and early episcopacy

At age twelve, Thục entered the minor seminary in An Ninh. He spent eight years there before going on to study philosophy at the major seminary in Huế. Following his ordination as a priest on 20 December 1925, he was selected to study theology in Rome, and is often said to have earned three doctorates from the Pontifical Gregorian University in philosophy, theology, and Canon law; this is not substantiated by the university's archives however. He briefly lectured at the Sorbonne and gained teaching qualifications before returning to Vietnam in 1927.

On 8 January 1938, Pope Pius XI created the Apostolic Vicariate of Vĩnh Long in Vietnam, and personally chose Thục (now aged 41) to be it its first Vicar Apostolic. On 4 May of the same year, with his family in attendance, Thục was consecrated a bishop by Archbishop Antonin Drapier, Apostolic Delegate to Indochina, and co-consecrators Bishop Isidore-Marie-Joseph Dumortier, M.E.P., Vicar Apostolic of Saigon, and Bishop Dominique Maria Hồ Ngọc Cẩn, Vicar Apostolic of Bùi Chu.

In 1950 Diệm and Thục applied for permission to travel to Rome for the Holy Year celebrations at the Vatican but went instead to Japan to lobby Prince Cường Để to enlist support to seize power. They met Wesley Fishel, an American academic consultant for the U.S. government. Fishel was a proponent of the anti-colonial, anti-communist third force doctrine in Asia and was impressed by Diệm. He helped the brothers organise contacts and meetings in the United States to enlist support.

With the outbreak of the Korean War and McCarthyism in the early 1950s, Vietnamese anti-communists were a sought-after commodity in the United States. Diệm and Thục were given a reception at the State Department with the Acting Secretary of State James Webb, where Thục did much of the talking. Diệm and Thục also forged links with Cardinal Francis Spellman, the most politically influential cleric of his time, and Spellman became one of Diệm's most powerful advocates. Diệm then managed an audience with Pope Pius XII in Rome with his brother's help, and then settled in the US as a guest of the Maryknoll Fathers. Spellman helped Diệm to garner support among right-wing and Catholic circles. Thục was widely seen as more genial, loquacious, and diplomatic than his brother, and it was acknowledged that Thục would be highly influential in the future regime. As French power in Vietnam declined, Diệm’s support in America, which Thục helped to nurture, made his stock rise. Bảo Đại made Diệm the Prime Minister of the State of Vietnam because he thought Diệm's connections would secure foreign financial aid.

Diệm's rule

In October 1955, Diệm deposed Bảo Đại in a fraudulent referendum organised by Nhu and declared himself President of the newly proclaimed Republic of Vietnam, which then concentrated power in the Ngô family, who were dedicated Roman Catholics in a Buddhist majority country. Power was enforced through secret police and the imprisonment and torture of political and religious opponents. The Ngôs' policies and conduct inflamed religious tensions. The government was biased towards Catholics in public service and military promotions, as well as the allocation of land, business favors and tax concessions. Thục, the most powerful religious leader in the country, was allowed to solicit "voluntary contributions to the Church" from Saigon businessmen, which was likened to "tax notices". Thục also used his position to acquire farms, businesses, urban real estate, rental property and rubber plantations for the Catholic Church. He also used Army of the Republic of Vietnam personnel to work on his timber and construction projects.

On 24 November 1960, Thục was appointed Archbishop of Huế by John XXIII.

Buddhist unrest and downfall of Diệm

In May 1963, in the central city of Huế, Buddhists were prohibited from displaying the Buddhist flag during Vesak celebrations commemorating the birth of Gautama Buddha, when the government cited a regulation prohibiting the display of non-government flags at Thục's request. A few days earlier, Catholics were encouraged to fly flags to celebrate Thục's 25th anniversary as bishop, but were ordered by Diem's government to fly Vietnamese flags as more important. Government funds were used to pay for Thục's anniversary celebrations, and the residents of Huế—a Buddhist stronghold—were also forced to contribute. These perceived double standards led to a Buddhist protest against the government. Buddhist leader Thích Trí Quang proclaimed a five-point "manifesto of the monks" that demanded freedom to fly the Buddhist flag, religious equality between Buddhists and Catholics, compensation for the victims' families, an end to arbitrary arrests, and punishment of the officials responsible. The protest was ended when nine civilians were killed because of a bomb, said to have been placed by the Việt Cộng. American journalists, who supported American intervention in Vietnam and opposed Diem for opposing it, blamed the military and even Archbishop Thuc for the deaths,   Later, the Ngôs' forces entered the Buddhist pagodas across the country. The synchronized military operations, the speed at which banners were erected declaring the ARVN resolve to defeat communism, and doctored propaganda photos purporting to show Việt Cộng infiltration of the Buddhists suggested that the actions were long premeditated. In an attempt to maintain secrecy, special printing presses had produced propaganda materials only hours before the raids.

Diệm was overthrown and assassinated together with Nhu on 2 November 1963. Ngô Đình Cẩn was sentenced to death and executed in 1964. Of the six brothers, only Thục and Luyện survived the political upheavals in Vietnam. Luyện, the youngest, was serving as ambassador in London, and Thục had been summoned to Rome for the Second Vatican Council. Because of the coup, Thục remained in Rome during the Council years (1962–65). He was among the bishops who were against the statements of the Council.

Beginning of exile

After the closing of the Second Vatican Council, none of the relevant governments – American, Vietnamese or the Vatican – consented to Thục returning to Vietnam.

According to Thục, the Americans forced the South Vietnamese government to refuse him permission to return, and that Paul VI used this inability to return to force him to resign and appoint Bishop Philippe Nguyễn Kim Điền, one of Paul VI's favorites, as his replacement.

He began his exile in Rome.

Consecrations of bishops and declaration of sedevacantism

A Swiss priest Thục formerly knew in Écône, Switzerland, Father Maurice Revaz, former Chancellor of the Swiss Diocese of Sion and professor of canon law in Ecône at the International Seminary of Saint Pius X of the traditionalist Society of Saint Pius X (SSPX), came to Thục and invited him to go to Spain, saying that the Blessed Virgin Mary wanted him to render her a service. On the recommendation of Archbishop Marcel Lefebvre (Thuc, like Lefebvre, was against the statements of the Second Vatican Council), on 1 January 1976, in El Palmar de Troya, Spain, Thục ordained Clemente Domínguez y Gómez — who claimed to have repeatedly witnessed apparitions of the Blessed Virgin Mary — and others as priests, and on 11 January 1976, consecrated Dominguez and four others as bishops. Thục stated that he had gone to Palmar de Troya on the spur of the moment, though contemporary sources show him to have been a regular visitor since 1968.

On 7 May 1981, Thục consecrated the independent priest Michel-Louis Guérard des Lauriers as a bishop. Des Lauriers was a Dominican theologian, an expert on the dogma of the Assumption, and an advisor to Pope Pius XII. On 17 October, Thục consecrated the two Mexican sedevacantist priests and former seminary professors Moisés Carmona and Adolfo Zamora as bishops. Carmona and Zamora were among the priests who formed the Unión Católica Trento (Tridentine Catholic Union).

On 21 March, Laetare Sunday, he publicly proclaimed this declaration during a Pontifical High Mass in Sankt Michael Church in Munich.

In response to his episcopal consecrations for the sedevacantists in Toulon in 1981 and to his declaration of sedevacantism, the Vatican again declared him ipso facto excommunicated.

His newly consecrated bishops did not form a united structure and organization, but became a fragmented group, many limiting themselves essentially to sacramental ministry and only consecrated a few other bishops for various sedevacantist priests or groups.

In 1982, Thuc declared:

In 1983, Thục departed for the United States at the invitation of Bishop Louis Vezelis, an American Franciscan former missionary priest who later became a sedevacantist bishop. Vezelis was consecrated a bishop by the American sedevacantist Bishop George J. Musey (consecrated in 1982 by Carmona) and by co-consecrators Carmona and Zamora (the two Mexican sedevacantist bishops Thục consecrated on 17 October 1981). Thục collaborated with Vezelis in the operation of a seminary in Rochester, New York, United States.

Reconciliation and death

Thục began to be increasingly sought-out by the expatriate and refugee Vietnamese community, including old friends and contacts from Huế and Saigon. They facilitated his extraction from sedevacantism and Thục returned to the jurisdiction of the Catholic Church definitively in 1984.

Des Lauriers wrote that:

That his retraction was false is affirmed by some sedevacantists, and so is the belief that he was kidnapped or abducted by the Vietnamese clergy when he left Bishop Vezelis' Franciscan monastery and was taken to Missouri, where he died.

See also

Roman Catholicism in Vietnam

References

Sources

Further reading

 by Bishop Michel-Louis Guérard des Lauriers, O.P.
Declaration of sedevacantism of Archbishop Ngô Đình Thục
PDF Document of Einsicht, 1982; includes photographic documentation on many of Archbishop Thục's consecrations

1897 births
1984 deaths
People from Huế
20th-century Roman Catholic archbishops in Vietnam
Ngo family
Academic staff of the University of Paris
Participants in the Second Vatican Council
People temporarily excommunicated by the Catholic Church
Sedevacantists
Traditionalist Catholic bishops
Vietnamese traditionalist Catholics
Thục line bishops
Vietnamese anti-communists
Vietnamese exiles
Vietnamese Roman Catholic archbishops